Stamford is a rural town and locality in the Shire of Flinders, Queensland, Australia.

Geography 
It is situated in the north-east of the locality.

Chinbi is a neighbourhood within the locality to the south-west of the town of Stamford based around the former Chinbi railway station.

Whitewood is a neighbourhood within the locality south-west of Chinbi based around the former Whitewood railway station.

The land use is grazing on native vegetation.

History 
Stamford was once an overnight stop for Cobb & Co coaches travelling between Winton and Hughenden.

The  Hughenden-Winton railway line (a branch line of the Great Northern railway line) opened to Stamford in 1897, closing officially in 2008 and dismantled in 2012. It followed the same route as the Kennedy Developmental Road. There were a number of now-abandoned railway stations on the line within the locality (from north-west to south-east):

 Alba railway station
Waback railway station
Warianna railway station
Stamford railway station, serving the town of Stamford
Chinbi railway station
Whitewood railway station
 Tarvano railway station

Stamford Provisional School opened in 1899 and closed in 1906.

The neighbourhood of Chinbi takes its name from the Chinbi railway station, which in turn was named on 18 February 1915 by the Queensland Railways Department. It is an Aboriginal word meaning star. 

Stamford State School opened on 23 January 1984. It closed on 29 July 2013. The school was located at 5  Marathon Stamford Road.

On 9 June 2003 in the Queen's Birthday Honours List, Mrs Jean Eva Anderson of Ballater Station of Stamford was awarded the Medal of the Order of Australia for her "service to the community of Hughenden, particularly through the Country Womens Association". She had given 52 years of service to the Hughenden branch of the Queensland Country Women's Association. Her award was presented to her by the then Governor of Queensland, Quentin Bryce.

In 2012, the town of Stamford consisted of a roadhouse and has a permanent population of 3. 

Prior to 19 November 2021, the town of Marathon was within the locality of Stamford. However, this arrangement caused confusion, so on 19 November 2021, a new locality of Marathon was created around the town, excising the land from the localities of Dutton River and Stamford.

Economy
There are a number of homesteads in the locality, including:

 Abbotsford
 Afton Downs
 Aireworth
 Cannonball
 Cannum Downs
 Conamore
 Coorabelle
 Cracrin
 Dalmuir
 Eldorado
 Elvira
 Glenelg
 Hazelwood
 Hilltop
 Hillview
 Illalong
 Kalboona
 Katandra
 Killarney
 Limbri
 Maidavale
 Malakoff Downs
 Maranie
 Marathon South
 Moonby Downs
 Morvada
 Mugwee Outstation
 Nottingham Downs
 Ophir Downs
 Roscaven
 Stamford Downs
 Stanley Downs
 Star Downs
 Tamworth
 Terranburby
 Thornhill
 Vellum Downs
 Vuna
 Waihaorunga
 Warianna Outstation
 Weanbah
 Wilfred Downs
 Woolfield
 Wyoming

Education
There are no schools in Stamford. The nearest primary schools are Hughenden State School in neighbouring Hughenden to the north-east and Cameron Downs State School in neighbouring Tangorin to the east. The nearest secondary school is Hughenden State School which provides schooling to Year 12. However, given the size of the locality, the distances involved may necessitate using alternatives such as distance education and boarding schools.

Events

The Stamford Races are a popular social event in the area involving horse racing.

References

External links

 

Towns in Queensland
Shire of Flinders (Queensland)
Localities in Queensland